= Tight Squeeze Hollow =

Valley in West Virginia, United States

Coordinates: 39°08′38″N 81°31′47″W

Tight Squeeze Hollow is a valley in the U.S. state of West Virginia.

Tight Squeeze Hollow was descriptively named for its narrow shape.
